Principles of Economics may refer to a number of texts by different academic economists:

Grundsätze der Volkswirtschaftslehre (Principles of Economics) (1870) by Carl Menger, the first to use the title, dropping "political" from the term "political economy"
Principles of Economics (1890) by Alfred Marshall
Principles of Economics (1998) by N. Gregory Mankiw, a popular contemporary and introductory economics text